The 2011 2. divisjon consists of 56 teams divided into 4 groups. Follo, Tromsdalen and Moss were relegated from the 2010 Norwegian First Division. Lillehammer avoided relegation to the 3. divisjon due to the bankruptcy of Lyn.

League tables

Group 1

Group 2

Group 3

Group 4

References

External links
AVDELINGSOPPSETT 2. divisjon MENN at fotball.no

Norwegian Second Division seasons
3
Norway
Norway